P'tite fleur aimée ("Little beloved flower", also known as P'tite fleur fanée, "Little faded flower"), is the best known song from the island of Réunion. While "La Marseillaise" is the official national anthem, "P'tite fleur aimée" is considered an unofficial local anthem.

The text is written in Réunion Creole by Georges Fourcade and the music is by Jules Fossy.

External links
Listen

French anthems
Music of Réunion
African anthems
Anthems of non-sovereign states